Victor Rudd (born March 18, 1991) is an American professional basketball player for Cariduros de Fajardo of the Baloncesto Superior Nacional (BSN). He played college basketball at Arizona State University, and at the University of South Florida. At a height of 6'9" (2.06 m) tall, he plays at the power forward position, and can also play as a center, if needed.

High school and college career
Rudd played high school basketball at Findlay Prep, in Henderson, Nevada.

Rudd played college basketball at Arizona State University, with the Sun Devils, from 2009 to 2010, and at the University of South Florida, with the Bulls, from 2011 to 2014.

Professional career
Rudd began his career in the NBA D-League, in the 2014–15 season, with the Delaware 87ers. On July 29, 2015, Rudd joined Nizhny Novgorod of the Russian VTB United League and European-wide 2nd tier level EuroCup. After a successful EuroCup season, in which he averaged 15.8 points and 6.7 rebounds per game, Rudd was named to the All-EuroCup Second Team.

On August 18, 2016, Rudd signed a one-year contract with the Israeli team Maccabi Tel Aviv. During his season with the club, Rudd was selected to the Israeli League All-Star game and helped Maccabi to win the Israeli Basketball State Cup title.

On September 2, 2017, Rudd signed with the Turkish team Gaziantep Basketbol for the 2017–18 season.

On February 15, 2018, Rudd signed with CSKA Moscow of the VTB United League and  the EuroLeague for a one-month temporary contract with an option to prolong it for the rest of the season, which CSKA exercised on March 17. Rudd officially parted ways with the team on May 23, 2018. On September 17, Rudd signed with Auxilium Torino of the Italian Lega Basket Serie A.

On October 13, 2019, he has signed with s.Oliver Würzburg of the German Basketball Bundesliga.  After averaging 7 points, 3.8 rebounds and 2.5 assists per game in the Bundesliga, Rudd parted ways with the team on February 18, 2020. On August 6, he signed with Stal Ostrów Wielkopolski of the Polish Basketball League. After averaging 8.7 points per game in his first three games, Rudd was released by the team on September 15. On October 13, he signed with Capitanes de Arecibo of the Baloncesto Superior Nacional.

During the 2021–22 season, Rudd played with Club Biguá de Villa Biarritz. On April 10, 2022, he had team-highs of 20 points and 9 rebounds in the 2022 BCL Americas Final, which Biguá lost to São Paulo.

In August 2022, Rudd joined Spartans Distrito Capital.

The Basketball Tournament
Victor Rudd played for HBC Sicklerville in the 2018 edition of The Basketball Tournament. He scored 9 points and had 8 rebounds in the team's first-round loss to the Talladega Knights.

Career statistics

EuroLeague

|-
| style="text-align:left;"| 2016–17
| style="text-align:left;"| Maccabi
| 30 || 20 || 25.8 || .460 || .364 || .781 || 4.3 || 1.7 || .7 || .3 || 10.1 || 10.3
|-
| style="text-align:left;"| 2017–18
| style="text-align:left;"| CSKA Moscow
| 13 || 1 || 10.1 || .346 || .286 || .889 || 1.2 || .3 || .5 || .2 || 2.3 || 2.3
|- class="sortbottom"
| style="text-align:left;"| Career
| style="text-align:left;"|
| 43 || 21 || 21.1 || .449 || .353 || .795 || 3.3 || 1.3 || .6 || .3 || 7.7 || 7.9

References

External links
Victor Rudd at euroleague.net
Victor Rudd at eurobasket.com
Victor Rudd at realgm.com
Victor Rudd at Twitter
USF Bulls College bio

1991 births
Living people
American expatriate basketball people in Israel
American expatriate basketball people in Italy
American expatriate basketball people in Russia
American expatriate basketball people in Turkey
American expatriate basketball people in Uruguay
American men's basketball players
Arizona State Sun Devils men's basketball players
Auxilium Pallacanestro Torino players
Basketball players from Los Angeles
BC Nizhny Novgorod players
Capitanes de Arecibo players
Centers (basketball)
Delaware 87ers players
Findlay Prep alumni
Gaziantep Basketbol players
Lega Basket Serie A players
Maccabi Tel Aviv B.C. players
PBC CSKA Moscow players
Power forwards (basketball)
Club Biguá de Villa Biarritz basketball players
s.Oliver Würzburg players
South Florida Bulls men's basketball players
Spartans Distrito Capital players